Known locally as Orange Avenue, State Road 68 (SR 68) is a 4.5-mile-long east–west street in Fort Pierce, Florida. The eastern terminus of SR 68 is at an intersection with North Fourth Street (US 1-SR 5); the roadway continues east a short distance towards Indian River Drive (County Road 707) in downtown Fort Pierce without state or county designation. The western terminus is with Kings Highway (SR 713), just west of Interstate 95 (SR 9). West of Kings Highway, Orange Avenue transitions into County Road 68, heading west for another , maintaining the CR 68 designation as it crosses into Okeechobee County before ending at an intersection with US 441.

Initially a key road in the citrus industry, SR 68 has since become an important commuter road providing the residences of central Fort Pierce with access to Interstate 95 (SR 9) 0.3 miles east of SR 713. The rural nature of the western end of SR 68 is slowly giving way to urbanization, a trend throughout the Atlantic coast of the State of Florida, as orange groves are gradually being replaced by residential developments.

History
Originally, SR 68 extended from Micco Bluff Road in Okeechobee County west of Basinger near the Kissimmee River, following US 98-SR 700, Northeast 160th Street (present County Road 68), Parrott Avenue (US 441-SR 15), Northeast 224th Street (present County Road 68), and the aptly named Orange Avenue (present County Road 68) to SR 713 as it cuts across the wetlands and the orange groves of central Florida to Fort Pierce. All portions of SR 68 in Okeechobee County as well as the portion from the St. Lucie County east to Kings Highway were transferred to county control in the mid-1980s.

In the late 1990s, the alignment of SR 68 immediately west of US 1 was changed - Orange Avenue between N 7th Street and US 1 was made into an eastbound one-way road, carrying SR 68 along its 2 lanes towards US 1; westbound SR 68 was rerouted one block north of Orange Avenue along Avenue A. From US 1, Avenue A headed west as a 4-lane one-way street for two blocks before ending at N 7th Street. Traffic wishing to follow SR 68 west were forced to turn left onto N 7th Street, then immediately turn right one block later onto Orange Avenue and SR 68 west. A few years later, in the late 2000s, Orange Avenue between N 7th Street and US 1 was restored to two-way traffic, ending the ill-advised and short-lived Avenue A and N 7th Street's SR 68 designation.

Major intersections

References

External links

Florida Route Log (SR 68)

068
068
068
068
Fort Pierce, Florida